Dog sex may refer to: 

Sexual behavior of dogs
Canine reproduction, a social behavior of the domestic dog 
Dog breeding, the practice of mating selected specimens with the intent to maintain or produce specific qualities and characteristics
Doggy style, a group of sexual positions of humans
Zoophilia, the practice of sex between humans and animals (bestiality)

See also 
Dogging (sexual slang), a British euphemism for engaging in sexual acts in a semi-public place